This is a list of early Chinese texts that were composed before the collapse of the Eastern Han dynasty. The titles are rendered in Pinyin transcription and sorted alphabetically.

B 
Baihu tong 白虎通, 1 c. CE

C 
Cantongqi
Chuci
Chunqiu
Chunqiu Fanlu
Chunqiu Gongyang zhuan
Chunqiu Guliang zhuan
Chunqiu shiyu

D 
Da Dai Liji
Daodejing
Daozang Wang Bi ben Laozi
Dengxizi
Dong guan Han ji
Duduan

E 
Erya

F 
Fangyan
Fayan
Fengsu Tongyi

G 
Gongsun Longzi
Guanzi (text)
Guoyu

H 
Han Feizi
Han shi waizhuan
Hàn-jī
Hanshu
Heguanzi
Heshang Gong ben Laozi ji Heshang Gong zhu
Huainanzi
Huangdi neijing suwen
Huangdi sijing

J 
Jiuzhang suanshu
Jizhong Zhoushu

K 
Kongzi jiayu 孔子家語

L 
Laozi Daodejing
Lienü zhuan
Liexian Zhuan
Liezi
Liji
Lingshu Jing
Liutao
Lunheng
Lunyu
Lüshi Chunqiu

M 
Maoshi
Mengzi
Mozi
Mu Tianzi Zhuan (Tale of King Mu)

N 
Nanhua zhenjing
Nanjing

Q 
Qianfu lun
Qian Hanji

R 
Rong Cheng shi 容成氏 (Shanghai Museum corpus)

S 
San Guo Yan Yi (Romance of The Three Kingdoms)
Shang Jun Shu
Shangshu
Shangshu dazhuan
Shanhaijing
Shennong Ben Cao Jing
Shenzi (Shen Buhai) 
Shenzi (Shen Dao)
Shiji
Shijing
Shiming
Shĭzhòupiān (史籀篇)
Shizi
Shuihudi Qinmu zhujian (Shuihudi Qin bamboo texts)
Shujing
Shuowen Jiezi (aka Shuowen)
Shuoyuan
Sima fa
Sunzi bingfa
Sun Bin bingfa

T 
Taixuanjing
Taiyi Shengshui
Tang Yu zhi Dao 唐虞之道 (Guodian)

W 
Wei Liaozi
Wenzi
Wushi'er bingfang
Wuwei Handai yijian
Wu Yue chunqiu
Wuzi

X 
Xiaojing
Xinlun
Xinshu
Xinxu
Xunzi

Y 
Yu Xin
Yan danzi :zh:燕丹子
Yantie lun (Discourses on Salt and Iron)
Yanzi chunqiu
Yijing
Yili
Yilin
Yinwenzi 尹文子 :de:Yin Wen
Yizhoushu
Yuejue shu
Yuliaozi

Z 
Zhanguo ce
Zhonglun
Zhoubi suanjing
Zhouli
Zhouyi
Zhuangzi
Zhushu jinian
Zi Gao 子羔 (Shanghai Museum corpus)
Zuozhuan

See also
Chinese classics

References

 Michael Loewe (ed.): Early Chinese texts: a bibliographical guide, Berkeley 1993
 Reiner Stoppok (ed.): An Alphabetical Index to the Bibliography of the Hanyu Da Zidian, Honolulu, University of Hawaii Press 2003

Chinese classic texts
History of literature in China